Dovzhok may refer to several places in Ukraine:
 Dovzhok, Kamianets-Podilskyi Raion, a village in the Kamianets-Podilskyi Raion (district) of Khmelnytskyi Oblast 
 Dovzhok, Chernivtsi Oblast, a commune (selsoviet) in Chernivtsi Raion, Chernivtsi Oblast
 Dovzhok, Nemyriv Raion, a village in the Nemyriv Raion, Vinnytsia Oblast
 Dovzhok, Pohrebyshche Raion, a village in the Pohrebyshche Raion, Vinnytsia Oblast
 Dovzhok, Sharhorod Raion, a village in the Sharhorod Raion, Vinnytsia Oblast
 Dovzhok, Yampil Raion, a village in the Yampil Raion, Vinnytsia Oblast
 Dovzhok, Poltava Oblast, a village in the Zinkiv Raion of Poltava Oblast